The President is a mountain peak on The President/Vice-President Massif of the President Range, in eastern British Columbia. It is just north of Emerald Lake in Yoho National Park, near the Alpine Club of Canada's Stanley Mitchell hut.

History
The President was named Shaugnessy in 1904 by Edward Whymper after Thomas Shaugnessy, the president of the Canadian Pacific Railway.  In 1907, the mountain was renamed by the Alpine Club of Canada, after it was discovered that the name had already been used on a mountain in the Selkirks.

Climate

Based on the Köppen climate classification, The President is located in a subarctic climate with cold, snowy winters, and mild summers. Temperatures can drop below −20 C with wind chill factors below −30 C.

References

External links
 The President at bivouac.com

The President
The President
Mountains of Yoho National Park
Kootenay Land District